Harbour Grace was a small community served by the Canadian National Railway. In 1853 the Postmaster was Andrew Drysdale. It is located on the western shore of Conception Bay.

Harbour Grace Junction was a small community later named Whitburn. The first Waymaster was Wilcox Spracklin.

See also
 List of communities in Newfoundland and Labrador

Populated coastal places in Canada
Populated places in Newfoundland and Labrador